The 2015–16 Women's Volleyball Thailand League was the 11th edition of the highest level of Thai club volleyball.

Team
 Bangkok Glass
 King-Bangkok
 Supreme Chonburi E-Tech
 3BB Nakhonnont
 Thai-Denmark Nongrua
 Idea Khonkaen
 Nakhon Ratchasima
 Cosmo-Chiang Rai

Regular season

Ranking 

|}

Round 1 

|}

Round 2 

|}

Final standing

Awards

External links
 Official website

2015
Thailand League 
Volleyball,Thailand League
Thailand League 
Volleyball,Thailand League